The 8th running of the Amstel Gold Race for Women, a women's cycling race in the Netherlands, was held on 10 April 2022, serving as the 7th event of the 2021 UCI Women's World Tour. It was won after a 1.5 km breakaway the Italian Marta Cavalli ahead of Demi Vollering and Liane Lippert.

Results

See also
 2022 in women's road cycling

References

Amstel Gold Race for Women
Amstel Gold Race for Women
April 2022 sports events in the Netherlands